Alexander Wedderburn (1796-1843) was a Scottish-born Canadian businessman from Aberdeen.

References

1796 births
1843 deaths
People from Aberdeen
Canadian people of Scottish descent
Canadian businesspeople
Scottish businesspeople
19th-century British businesspeople